|}

The Jim Ford Challenge Cup was a National Hunt Listed chase in England. 
It was run at Wincanton over a distance of 3 miles and 1½ furlongs (5,130 metres), and it was scheduled to take place each year in February, on the same card as the Kingwell Hurdle.

The race was last run in 2008 having been turned into a handicap in 2006.
During the eighties and early nineties the race regularly featured contests between David Elsworth's locally trained horses (Combs Ditch, Desert Orchid, Cavvies Clown, Lesley Ann) attempting to preserve local honour in the face of invasion by the big battalions from Lambourn (Burrough Hill Lad, Brown Chamberlin, Diamond Edge) and Yorkshire (Bregawn, Silver Buck).

The race was named in honour of Jim Ford, a local trainer who won the 1955 Cheltenham Gold Cup with Gay Donald.

Winners since 1980

References
Racing Post

National Hunt chases
National Hunt races in Great Britain
Wincanton Racecourse
Discontinued horse races
Recurring sporting events disestablished in 2008